This is a selected list of the oldest rivers on Earth for which there is knowledge about their existence in past times.

Determination of age 
Generally, the age is estimated based primarily upon the age of any mountains it dissects; the age of the sea or ocean to which it eventually outflows can be irrelevant; for example, several rivers of the east side of the Appalachian Mountains are thought to be older than the Atlantic Ocean into which they flow.  If a river fully dissects a mountain range, then this generally indicates that the river existed at least at the time that the mountain range rose.

List of some of the world's oldest rivers

See also 
 Lists of rivers

References

Age
Rivers by age